West River    is a community in the Canadian province of Nova Scotia, located in  Pictou County .

It was formerly served by the Hopewell Subdivision of Canadian National Railway, which had a station in West River.

References

Communities in Pictou County